Ahmed Mohamed Ashoush (born 18 November 1955) is an Egyptian athlete (Track and Field). He competed in the men's shot put at the 1984 Summer Olympics and the 1988 Summer Olympics.

 Three times African champion in shot put, in 1984, 1985 and 1988.
 Won a bronze medal at the 1987 All-Africa Games.

Achievements

See also
List of champions of Africa of athletics
Egyptian athletes

References

1955 births
Living people
Egyptian male shot putters
African Games bronze medalists for Egypt
African Games medalists in athletics (track and field)
Athletes (track and field) at the 1984 Summer Olympics
Athletes (track and field) at the 1988 Summer Olympics
Olympic athletes of Egypt
Athletes (track and field) at the 1987 All-Africa Games